This is a list of the first women lawyer(s) and judge(s) in West Virginia. It includes the year in which the women were admitted to practice law (in parentheses). Also included are women who achieved other distinctions such becoming the first in their state to graduate from law school or become a political figure.

Firsts in West Virginia's history

Lawyer 

First female: Agnes Westbrook Morrison (1895)

State judges 

 First female: Elizabeth Hallanan (1951) in 1959 
 First African American female (circuit court): Irene Berger (1979) in 1994 
 First female (Fourth Circuit Court of Appeals): Stephanie Thacker (1990)

Federal judges 
First female (U.S. Magistrate Judge): Mary Stanley in 1992 
First African American female (U.S. District Court for the Southern District of West Virginia): Irene Berger (1979) in 2009  
First female (Chief Judge for Bankruptcy Court; U.S. District Court for the Southern District of West Virginia): B. McKay Mignault in 2022

Assistant United States Attorney 

 First female: Mary Stanley around 1977 
 First female (Northern District of West Virginia): Betsy C. Jividen in 2009

Deputy Attorney General 

 First female: Marianne Stonestreet

Assistant Attorney General 

First female: Virginia Mae Brown (1947) from 1952-1961

West Virginia State Bar Association 

 First female (president): Barbara Baxter from 1994-1995
 First African American female (president): Meshea Poore in 2017

West Virginia Judicial Association 

 First female (president): Jennifer Bailey in 2022

Firsts in local history

 Theresa Cogar Turner: First female to become a Judge of the Family Court Judge for Lewis, Braxton, and Upshur Counties, West Virginia (2016)
 Kathi McBee: First female magistrate in Barbour County, West Virginia (1996)
 Janet Steele (1977): First female judge in Fayette County, West Virginia
 Alice Johnson McChesney (1922): First female lawyer in Charleston, West Virginia [Kanawha County, West Virginia]
 Elizabeth Aileen Hatfield (1933): First female lawyer in Logan County, West Virginia
 Marye L. Wright: First African American male to graduate from the West Virginia University College of Law (1976)

See also  

 List of first women lawyers and judges in the United States
 Timeline of women lawyers in the United States
 Women in law

Other topics of interest 

 List of first minority male lawyers and judges in the United States
 List of first minority male lawyers and judges in West Virginia

References 

Lawyers, West Virginia, first
West Virginia, first
Women, West Virginia, first
Women, West Virginia, first
Women in West Virginia
West Virginia lawyers
Lists of people from West Virginia